Sveg is a locality and the seat of Härjedalen Municipality in Jämtland County, Sweden with 2,547 inhabitants in 2010.

Overview
Sveg is the largest urban area in Härjedalen and the fourth largest in the county of Jämtland. The Ljusnan river flows through the city.
Sveg is located on  Riksväg 84 which runs from Hudiksvall in Gävleborg County to the Norwegian border where it connects with Fylkesvei 31 
providing a route to Røros.
The addition of railway lines, Orsa–Svegs Järnväg between Orsa and Sveg  in 1909 together with connection line from 
Sveg to Brunflo  in 1922 and between Sveg and Hede in 1924, supported the development of large forest companies in the area.

Swedish author Henning Mankell (1948–2015) was brought up in Sveg, where his father was a district judge. Sveg  is the setting for his crime novel Danslärarens återkomst (2000) which was translated by Laurie Thompson (1938–2015) into English as The Return of the Dancing Master.

Hydroelectric power plants
Sveg Power Plant (Svegs kraftverk) is a hydroelectric power plant that began to be built in 1972. The work was greatly accelerated as the energy crisis increased the need for Swedish energy production. The power plant was commissioned in 1975. The power plant is located at the 18 meter high dam next to Lake Svegssjön, a water reservoir that was created when the  Ljusnan, Veman and Härjån rivers were dammed up in 1975.

There are two power plant facilities directly adjacent to the lake. Svegs kraftverk is the larger of the facilities, and the dam itself, is located near Sveg. The smaller power plant located at Kvarnforsen just south of Herrö was built in 1966 and is owned by Härjeåns Kraft AB.

Sveg  Church

The church is of stone with towers and narrower sacristy. It was built in 1845–47.  
The present church is believed to have been preceded by at least three prior church buildings, the first of which was probably built in the late 1000s. Construction was under the direction of Jacob Norin (1795–1864) from  Norrala  in Hälsingland. The church includes an altar from 1623  and a pulpit from 1649. The church bell was cast at Stockholm in 1683.

Climate
Sveg has a relatively mild subarctic climate. In spite of it being in the middle of the Scandinavian landmass on such a high latitude and a bit elevated, the winters are somewhat milder than expected, due to the mild North Atlantic air that often raises temperatures. In terms of Scandinavian climate, Sveg is an anomaly in that December is at least as cold as February, both averaging similar means.

See also
 Sveg.se
 Svegs IK
 Knatten
Sveg Airport

References

External links

Populated places in Härjedalen Municipality
Municipal seats of Jämtland County
Swedish municipal seats
Härjedalen